Akiodorididae are a taxonomic family of sea slugs, dorid nudibranchs, marine gastropod molluscs in the superfamily Onchidoridoidea.

Genera
Genera in the family Akiodorididae include:

 Akiodoris Bergh, 1879  
 Armodoris Minichev, 1972
 Doridunculus G. O. Sars, 1878
 Echinocorambe Valdés & Bouchet, 1998
 Prodoridunculus Thiele, 1912

References

 
Gastropod families